SM City Tanza is a shopping mall owned by SM Prime Holdings. It is the seventh SM Supermall to be opened in Cavite, first SM Supermall in Tanza and 80th in the country. It is located along Antero Soriano Highway corner Dr. Solis Street, Daang Amaya 2, Tanza, Cavite. The two-story mall opened with 89% of the available space leased.

History
SM Supermalls, a subsidiary of SM Prime, the largest mall operator in the country, since 2014 is negotiating with other land owners nearby Antero Soriano Highway in Barangay Daang Amaya 2 on their plan to build a new SM Mall in the town. Clearing operations and fencing of the SM City Tanza site was started  from 2018 until the construction was started in May 2020. SM City Tanza is SM Prime Holdings’ 80th supermall. It is also the seventh mall in the province of Cavite after SM City Bacoor, SM City Dasmarinas, SM City Molino, SM City Rosario, SM City Trece Martires, and SM Center Imus. SM also has a Marketmall in Dasmarinas. Mall blessing and ribbon-cutting ceremony held on October 13, a day before the mall grand opening on October 14, 2022, making it the seventh SM Supermall in Cavite and 80th in the country.

Prior to its opening, during his speech at the 108th Tanza Day. Mayor Yuri A. Pacumio, said approximately five months before the mall's opening that he "can’t wait for the opening of the new SM" as the mall would bring both new shopping options and job opportunities for residents.

In June 2022, around 1,000 senior citizens and persons with disabilities from Tanza sought jobs at the mall during a recruitment event. Mayor Pacumio said that 80% of the jobs were expected to be filled by Tanza residents.

Features

Design

The two-story and nearly  mall's design was inspired by the chief means of livelihood in Tanza, which were farming and fishing, as well by the nearby beach resorts along the coastline. Symbolizing warmth from the colors of the boats and the serenity of the sea, SM City Tanza's interiors have been configured in an L-shaped layout and provided with natural clerestory light that stretched across the mall area, including the Cyberzone.

The ceiling was accented with curvilinear cove-light lines that depicted the ripples of the sea. The mall also has a  events center, which was for activities and exhibits. It also featured a lush, landscaped indoor area, providing the mall with places to relax, shop and dine.

Tenants
Tenants include SMSTORE, SMSUPERMARKET, Ace Hardware, SMAPPLIANCE CENTER, Watsons, Pet Express, Miniso, Uniqlo, Crocs, Surplus and Banco De Oro.. The mall will have five cinemas which includes the SM Event Screen, the first SM Mall to have it.

References

Shopping malls in Cavite
Shopping malls established in 2022
SM Prime